Breda di Piave is a commune   in the province of Treviso, Veneto, northern Italy.

See also
Piave River

References

Cities and towns in Veneto